Theodorus Theunis 'Polla' Fourie (born 10 July 1945) is a former South African rugby union player.

Playing career
Fourie played provincial rugby for South Eastern Transvaal and was the first player from the union that was selected to play for the Springboks in a test match.

Fourie played in only one test match for the Springboks, the third test against the 1974 Lions at the Boet Erasmus Stadium in Port Elizabeth. He then toured with the Springboks to France at the end of 1974 and one of his fellow tourists was his brother, Carel. Fourie played in four tour matches, scoring three tries.

Test history

See also
List of South Africa national rugby union players – Springbok no.  476

References

1945 births
Living people
South African rugby union players
South Africa international rugby union players
People from Uitenhage
Rugby union flankers
Rugby union players from the Eastern Cape
Pumas (Currie Cup) players